Marty Riessen (born December 4, 1941) is an American former amateur and professional tennis player active from the 1960s to the 1980s. He was ranked as high as No. 11 in the world in singles on the ATP rankings in September 1974, though was ranked as high as world No. 8 by Lance Tingay of The Daily Telegraph in 1971 before the computer rankings. Renowned for his doubles play, Riessen was also a regular doubles partner of Australian tennis great Margaret Court, winning six of his seven major mixed titles and a career Grand Slam alongside her. Additionally a winner of two men's doubles Grand Slams, his highest doubles ranking was No. 3 in March 1980.

Career

Riessen played collegiate tennis at Northwestern University, where he reached the National Collegiate Athletic Association (NCAA) singles finals three times: 1962 (falling to Rafael Osuna of University of Southern California); 1963 and 1964 (falling to Dennis Ralston of USC both times). He was a semifinalist at the NCAA Doubles Championship with Clark Graebner in 1963 and 1964.

He won six singles titles in the open era, with the biggest coming in Cincinnati in 1974. (He won numerous other pre-open era titles, including two other Cincinnati titles in the pre-Open Era.) He also reached the quarterfinals in singles at both the Australian Open and the US Open in 1971.

He also won 53 doubles titles, including the US Open (in 1976), the French Open (1971, with Arthur Ashe), and seven ATP Masters Series events: Paris Indoor (1976), Canada (1971 & 1970), Monte Carlo (1970), Hamburg (1968 and 1969), and Rome (1968). He reached the doubles final at the US Open in 1978 and 1975, the Australian Open in 1971, and Wimbledon in 1969.

Distinctions and honors
 He was a member of the U.S. Davis Cup team in 1963, 1965, 1967, 1973 and 1981.
 The Marty Riessen tennis courts are in Osmond, Nebraska.
 Dunlop named one of its wooden racquets the "Marty Riessen."
 Riessen has been enshrined in the United States Tennis Association/Midwest Hall of Fame.
 He is one of two high school tennis players from the state of Illinois to win the singles title four years in a row, 1957–1960, representing Hinsdale Township, now Hinsdale Central High School.
 Riessen was also noted for his sportsmanship, not infrequently arguing that a judgement was incorrect and that points should be given against him.

Open era career finals

Singles: 22 (9 titles, 13 runner-ups)

Doubles: 80 (52–28)

Grand Slam finals

Doubles: 6 (2–4)

Mixed doubles: 9 (7–2)

References

External links

 
 
 

1941 births
Living people
American male tennis players
Australian Open (tennis) champions
French Open champions
Northwestern Wildcats men's basketball players
Northwestern Wildcats men's tennis players
Sportspeople from Boca Raton, Florida
People from Hinsdale, Illinois
American people of German descent
Tennis people from Florida
Tennis people from Illinois
US Open (tennis) champions
Wimbledon champions
Grand Slam (tennis) champions in mixed doubles
Grand Slam (tennis) champions in men's doubles
American men's basketball players